

Events

Pre-1600
 498 – After the death of Anastasius II, Symmachus is elected Pope in the Lateran Palace, while Laurentius is elected Pope in Santa Maria Maggiore.
 845 – The first duke of Brittany, Nominoe, defeats the Frankish king Charles the Bald at the Battle of Ballon near Redon.
1307 – Pope Clement V issues the papal bull Pastoralis Praeeminentiae which instructed all Christian monarchs in Europe to arrest all Templars and seize their assets.
1574 – Spanish navigator Juan Fernández discovers islands now known as the Juan Fernández Islands off Chile.

1601–1900
1635 – Dutch colonial forces on Taiwan launch a pacification campaign against native villages, resulting in Dutch control of the middle and south of the island.
1718 – Royal Navy Lieutenant Robert Maynard attacks and boards the vessels of the British pirate Edward Teach (best known as "Blackbeard") off the coast of North Carolina. The casualties on both sides include Maynard's first officer Mister Hyde and Teach himself.
1837 – Canadian journalist and politician William Lyon Mackenzie calls for a rebellion against the United Kingdom in his essay "To the People of Upper Canada", published in his newspaper The Constitution.
1855 – In Birmingham, England, Albert, Prince Consort lays the foundation stone of the Birmingham and Midland Institute. 
1869 – In Dumbarton, Scotland, the clipper Cutty Sark is launched. 
1873 – The French steamer SS Ville du Havre sinks in 12 minutes after colliding with the Scottish iron clipper Loch Earn in the Atlantic, with a loss of 226 lives.

1901–present
1908 – The Congress of Manastir establishes the Albanian alphabet.
1935 – The China Clipper inaugurates the first commercial transpacific air service, connecting Alameda, California with Manila.
1940 – World War II: Following the initial Italian invasion, Greek troops counterattack into Italian-occupied Albania and capture Korytsa.
1942 – World War II: Battle of Stalingrad: General Friedrich Paulus sends Adolf Hitler a telegram saying that the German 6th Army is surrounded.
1943 – World War II: Cairo Conference: U.S. President Franklin D. Roosevelt, British Prime Minister Winston Churchill, and Chinese Premier Chiang Kai-shek meet in Cairo, Egypt, to discuss ways to defeat Japan.
  1943   – Lebanon gains independence from France, nearly two years after it was first announced by the Free French government.
1948 – Chinese Civil War: Elements of the Chinese Communist Second Field Army under Liu Bocheng trap the Nationalist 12th Army, beginning the Shuangduiji Campaign, the largest engagement of the Huaihai Campaign.
1955 – The Soviet Union launches RDS-37, a 1.6 megaton two stage hydrogen bomb designed by Andrei Sakharov. The bomb was dropped over Semipalatinsk.
1956 – The Summer Olympics, officially known as the games of the XVI Olympiad, are opened in Melbourne, Australia.
1963 – U.S. President John F. Kennedy is assassinated and Texas Governor John Connally is seriously wounded by Lee Harvey Oswald, who also kills Dallas Police officer J. D. Tippit after fleeing the scene. U.S Vice President Lyndon B. Johnson is sworn in as the 36th President of the United States afterwards.
  1963   – Five Indian generals are killed in a helicopter crash, due to collision with two parallel lines of telegraph cables.
1967 – UN Security Council Resolution 242 is adopted, establishing a set of the principles aimed at guiding negotiations for an Arab–Israeli peace settlement.
1971 – In Britain's worst mountaineering tragedy, the Cairngorm Plateau Disaster, five children and one of their leaders are found dead from exposure in the Scottish mountains.
1974 – The United Nations General Assembly grants the Palestine Liberation Organization observer status.
1975 – Juan Carlos is declared King of Spain following the death of Francisco Franco.
1977 – British Airways inaugurates a regular London to New York City supersonic Concorde service.
1988 – In Palmdale, California, the first prototype B-2 Spirit stealth bomber is revealed.
1989 – In West Beirut, a bomb explodes near the motorcade of Lebanese President René Moawad, killing him.
1990 – British Prime Minister Margaret Thatcher withdraws from the Conservative Party leadership election, confirming the end of her Prime-Ministership.
1995 – Toy Story is released as the first feature-length film created completely using computer-generated imagery. 
  1995   – The 7.3  Gulf of Aqaba earthquake shakes the Sinai Peninsula and Saudi Arabia region with a maximum Mercalli intensity of VIII (Severe), killing eight and injuring 30, and generating a non-destructive tsunami.
2002 – In Nigeria, more than 100 people are killed at an attack aimed at the contestants of the Miss World contest.
2003 – Baghdad DHL attempted shootdown incident: Shortly after takeoff, a DHL Express cargo plane is struck on the left wing by a surface-to-air missile and forced to land.
  2003   – England defeats Australia in the 2003 Rugby World Cup Final, becoming the first side from the Northern Hemisphere to win the tournament. 
2004 – The Orange Revolution begins in Ukraine, resulting from the presidential elections.
2005 – Angela Merkel becomes the first female Chancellor of Germany.
2012 – Ceasefire begins between Hamas in the Gaza Strip and Israel after eight days of violence and 150 deaths.
2015 – A landslide in Hpakant, Kachin State, northern Myanmar kills at least 116 people near a jade mine, with around 100 more missing.
2022 – A shooting at a Walmart in Chesapeake, Virginia leaves 7 workers dead, including the shooter, and 4 others injured.

Births

Pre-1600
1329 – Elisabeth of Meissen, Burgravine of Nuremberg (d. 1375)
1428 – Richard Neville, 16th Earl of Warwick, English kingmaker (d. 1471)
1515 – Mary of Guise, Queen of Scots (d. 1560)
1519 – Johannes Crato von Krafftheim, German humanist and physician (d. 1585)
1532 – Anne of Denmark, Electress of Saxony (d. 1585)
1533 – Alfonso II d'Este, Duke of Ferrara, Italian noble (d. 1597)
1564 – Henry Brooke, 11th Baron Cobham, English politician, Lord Lieutenant of Kent (d. 1610)

1601–1900
1602 – Elisabeth of France (d. 1644)
1635 – Francis Willughby, English ornithologist and ichthyologist (d. 1672)
1643 – René-Robert Cavelier, Sieur de La Salle, French-American explorer (d. 1687)
1690 – François Colin de Blamont, French pianist and composer (d. 1760)
1698 – Pierre de Rigaud, Marquis de Vaudreuil-Cavagnial, Canadian-American soldier and politician, 10th Governor of Louisiana (d. 1778)
1709 – Franz Benda, Czech violinist and composer (d. 1786)
1710 – Wilhelm Friedemann Bach, German organist and composer (d. 1784)
1721 – Joseph Frederick Wallet DesBarres, Swiss-Canadian cartographer and politician, Lieutenant Governor of Nova Scotia (d. 1824)
1728 – Charles Frederick, Grand Duke of Baden (d. 1811)
1744 – Abigail Adams, American wife of John Adams, 2nd First Lady of the United States (d. 1818)
1780 – Conradin Kreutzer, German composer (d. 1849)
  1780   – José Cecilio del Valle, Honduran journalist, lawyer, and politician, Foreign Minister of Mexico (d. 1834)
1787 – Rasmus Rask, Danish linguist, philologist, and scholar (d. 1823)
1808 – Thomas Cook, English businessman, founded Thomas Cook Group (d. 1892)
1814 – Serranus Clinton Hastings, American lawyer and politician, 1st Chief Justice of California (d. 1893)
1819 – George Eliot, English novelist and poet (d. 1880)
1820 – Katherine Plunket, Irish supercentenarian (d. 1932)
1824 – Georg von Oettingen, Estonian-German physician and ophthalmologist (d. 1916)
1836 – George Barham, English businessman, founded Express County Milk Supply Company (d. 1913)
1845 – Aleksander Kunileid, Estonian composer and educator (d. 1875)
1849 – Christian Rohlfs, German painter and academic (d. 1938)
1852 – Paul-Henri-Benjamin d'Estournelles de Constant, French politician and diplomat, Nobel Prize laureate (d. 1924)
1856 – Heber J. Grant, American religious leader, 7th President of The Church of Jesus Christ of Latter-day Saints (d. 1945)
1857 – George Gissing, English novelist (d. 1903)
1859 – Cecil Sharp, English folk song scholar (d. 1924)
1861 – Ranavalona III of Madagascar (d. 1917)
1868 – John Nance Garner, American lawyer and politician, 32nd Vice President of the United States (d. 1967)
1869 – André Gide, French novelist, essayist, and dramatist, Nobel Prize laureate (d. 1951)
1870 – Howard Brockway, American pianist, composer, and educator (d. 1951)
  1870   – Harry Graham, Australian cricketer (d. 1911)
1873 – Leo Amery, Indian-English journalist and politician, Secretary of State for the Colonies (d. 1955)
  1873   – Johnny Tyldesley, English cricketer (d. 1930)
1876 – Percival Proctor Baxter, American lawyer and politician, 53rd Governor of Maine (d.1969)
  1876   – Emil Beyer, American gymnast and triathlete (d. 1934)
1877 – Endre Ady, Hungarian journalist and poet (d. 1919)
  1877   – Joan Gamper, Swiss-Spanish footballer, founded FC Barcelona (d. 1930)
1881 – Enver Pasha, Ottoman general and politician (d. 1922)
1884 – C. J. "Jack" De Garis, Australian entrepreneur (d. 1926)
  1884   – Sulaiman Nadvi, Pakistani historian, author, and scholar (d. 1953)
1890 – Charles de Gaulle, French general and politician, 18th President of France (d. 1970)
1891 – Edward Bernays, Austrian-American publicist (d. 1995)
1893 – Harley Earl, American businessman (d. 1969)
  1893   – Lazar Kaganovich, Soviet politician (d. 1991)
1896 – David J. Mays, American lawyer and author (d. 1971)
1897 – Paul Oswald Ahnert, German astronomer and educator (d. 1989)
  1897   – Harry Wilson, English-American actor and singer (d. 1987)
1898 – Wiley Post, American pilot (d. 1935)
1899 – Hoagy Carmichael, American singer-songwriter, pianist, and actor (d. 1981)
1900 – Tom Macdonald, Welsh journalist and author (d. 1980)
  1900   – Helenka Pantaleoni, American actress and humanitarian, co-founded U.S. Fund for UNICEF (d. 1987)

1901–present
1901 – Béla Juhos, Hungarian-Austrian philosopher from the Vienna Circle (d. 1971)
  1901   – Joaquín Rodrigo, Spanish pianist and composer (d. 1999)
1902 – Philippe Leclerc de Hauteclocque, French general (d. 1947)
  1902   – Emanuel Feuermann, Austrian-American cellist and educator (d. 1942) 
  1902   – Humphrey Gibbs, English-Rhodesian politician, 15th Governor of Southern Rhodesia (d. 1990)
  1902   – Albert Leduc, Canadian ice hockey player (d. 1990)
  1902   – Ethel Smith, American organist (d. 1996)
1904 – Miguel Covarrubias, Mexican painter and illustrator (d. 1957)
  1904   – Louis Néel, French physicist and academic, Nobel Prize laureate (d. 2000)
  1904   – Fumio Niwa, Japanese author (d. 2005)
1906 – Jørgen Juve, Norwegian football player and journalist (d. 1983)
1909 – Mikhail Mil, Russian engineer, founded the Mil Moscow Helicopter Plant (d. 1970)
1910 – Mary Jackson, American actress (d. 2005)
1911 – Ralph Guldahl, American golfer (d. 1987)
1912 – Doris Duke, American art collector and philanthropist (d. 1993)
1913 – Benjamin Britten, English pianist, composer, and conductor (d. 1976) 
  1913   – Gardnar Mulloy, American tennis player and coach (d. 2016)
  1913   – Cecilia Muñoz-Palma, Filipino lawyer and jurist (d. 2006)
  1913   – Jacqueline Vaudecrane, French figure skater and coach (d. 2018)
1914 – Peter Townsend, Burmese-English captain and pilot (d. 1995)
1915 – Oswald Morris, British cinematographer (d. 2014)
1917 – Jon Cleary, Australian author and playwright (d. 2010)
  1917   – Andrew Huxley, English physiologist and biophysicist, Nobel Prize laureate (d. 2012)
  1917   – Sir Keith Shann, Australian diplomat (d. 1988)
1918 – Claiborne Pell, American captain and politician (d. 2009)
1919 – Máire Drumm, Irish politician (d. 1976)
1920 – Baidyanath Misra, Indian economist (d. 2019)
  1920   – Anne Crawford, Israeli-English actress (d. 1956)
1921 – Brian Cleeve, Irish sailor, author, and playwright (d. 2003)
  1921   – Rodney Dangerfield, American comedian, actor, rapper, and screenwriter (d. 2004)
1922 – Fikret Amirov, Azerbaijani composer (d. 1984)
  1922   – Wiyogo Atmodarminto, Indonesian general and politician, 10th Governor of Jakarta (d. 2012)
  1922   – Eugene Stoner, American engineer and weapons designer, designed the AR-15 rifle (d. 1997)
1923 – Arthur Hiller, Canadian actor, director, and producer (d. 2016)
  1923   – Dika Newlin, American singer-songwriter and pianist (d. 2006)
1924 – Geraldine Page, American actress and singer (d. 1987)
  1924   – Les Johnson, Australian politician (d. 2015)
1925 – Jerrie Mock, American pilot (d. 2014)
  1925   – Gunther Schuller, American horn player, composer, and conductor (d. 2015)
1926 – Lew Burdette, American baseball player and coach (d. 2007)
  1926   – Arthur Jones, American businessman, founded Nautilus, Inc. and MedX Corporation (d. 2007)
1927 – Steven Muller, German-American scholar and academic (d. 2013)
  1927   – Robert E. Valett, American psychologist, teacher, and author (d. 2008)
1928 – Tim Beaumont, English priest and politician (d. 2008)
1929 – Staughton Lynd, American lawyer, historian, author, and activist (d. 2022)
  1929   – Keith Rayner, Australian Archbishop
1930 – Peter Hall, English actor, director, and manager (d. 2017)
  1930   – Peter Hurford, English organist and composer
1932 – Robert Vaughn, American actor and director (d. 2016)
1933 – Merv Lincoln, Australian Olympic athlete (d. 2016)
1934 – Rita Sakellariou, Greek singer (d. 1999)
1935 – Ludmila Belousova, Soviet ice skater (d. 2017)
1936 – John Bird, English actor, writer and satirist (d. 2022)
  1936   – Archie Gouldie, Canadian-American wrestler (d. 2016)
1937 – Zenon Jankowski, Polish pilot and military officer
  1937   – Nikolai Kapustin, Russian pianist and composer (d. 2020)
1938 – John Eleuthère du Pont, American businessman and philanthropist, founded Delaware Museum of Natural History (d. 2010)
  1938   – Henry Lee, Chinese-American criminologist and academic
1939 – Tom West, American engineer and author (d. 2011)
  1939   – Mulayam Singh Yadav, Indian politician, 24th Indian Minister of Defence (d. 2022)
1940 – Terry Gilliam, American-English actor, director, animator, and screenwriter
  1940   – Roy Thomas, American author
  1940   – Andrzej Żuławski, Polish director and screenwriter (d. 2016)
1941 – Tom Conti, Scottish actor and director
  1941   – Jacques Laperrière, Canadian ice hockey player and coach
  1941   – Ron McClure, American jazz bassist
  1941   – Volker Roemheld, German physiologist and biologist (d. 2013)
  1941   – Terry Stafford, American singer-songwriter (d. 1996)
  1941   – Jesse Colin Young, American singer-songwriter and bass player
1942 – Guion Bluford, American colonel, pilot, and astronaut
  1942   – Floyd Sneed, Canadian drummer
1943 – Yvan Cournoyer, Canadian ice hockey player and coach
  1943   – Billie Jean King, American tennis player and sportscaster
  1943   – William Kotzwinkle, American novelist and screenwriter
  1943   – Ricky May, New Zealand-Australian jazz singer (d. 1988)
  1943   – Mushtaq Mohammad, Pakistani cricketer
  1943   – Roger L. Simon, American author and screenwriter
1945 – Elaine Weyuker, American computer scientist, engineer, and academic
  1945   – Kari Tapio, Finnish singer (d. 2010)
1946 – Aston Barrett, Jamaican bass player and songwriter 
1947 – Sandy Alderson, American businessman and academic
  1947   – Rod Price, English guitarist and songwriter (d. 2005)
  1947   – Nevio Scala, Italian footballer and manager 
  1947   – Salt Walther, American race car driver (d. 2012)
  1947   – Valerie Wilson Wesley, American journalist and author
1948 – Radomir Antić, Serbian footballer and manager (d. 2020)
  1948   – Stewart Guthrie, New Zealand police officer (d. 1990)
  1948   – Saroj Khan, Indian dance choreographer, known as "The Mother of Dance/Choreography in India" (d. 2020)
1949 – Richard Carmona, American physician and politician, 17th Surgeon General of the United States
  1949   – David Pietrusza, American author and historian
1950 – Lyman Bostock, American baseball player (d. 1978)
  1950   – Jim Jefferies, Scottish footballer and manager
  1950   – Paloma San Basilio, Spanish singer-songwriter and producer
  1950   – Art Sullivan, Belgian singer (d. 2019)
  1950   – Steven Van Zandt, American singer-songwriter, guitarist, producer, and actor
  1950   – Tina Weymouth, American singer-songwriter and bass player 
1951 – Kent Nagano, American conductor, director, and manager
1952 – Nicholas Suntzeff, American astronomer and cosmologist
1953 – Wayne Larkins, English cricketer and footballer
1954 – Denise Epoté, Cameroonian journalist at the head of the Africa management of TV5 Monde
  1954   – Paolo Gentiloni, Italian politician, 57th Prime Minister of Italy
  1954   – Carol Tomcala, Australian sports shooter
1955 – George Alagiah, British journalist
  1955   – James Edwards, American basketball player
1956 – Lawrence Gowan, Scottish-Canadian singer-songwriter and keyboard player 
  1956   – Richard Kind, American actor
  1956   – Ron Randall, American author and illustrator
1957 – Donny Deutsch, American businessman and television host
  1957   – Alan Stern, American engineer and planetary scientist
1958 – Horse, Scottish singer-songwriter and guitarist
  1958   – Jamie Lee Curtis, American actress
  1958   – Lee Guetterman, American baseball player
  1958   – Ibrahim Ismail of Johor, Sultan of Johor
  1958   – Chic McSherry, Scottish musician, businessman and writer
  1958   – Jason Ringenberg, American singer-songwriter and guitarist
1959 – Eddie Frierson, American actor
  1959   – Frank McAvennie, Scottish footballer
  1959   – Fabio Parra, Colombian cyclist
  1959   – Lenore Zann, Australian-Canadian actress, singer, and politician
1960 – Jim Bob, English singer-songwriter and guitarist
  1960   – Leos Carax, French actor, director, and screenwriter
1961 – Mariel Hemingway, American actress
  1961   – Stephen Hough, English-Australian pianist and composer
  1961   – Randal L. Schwartz, American computer programmer and author
1962 – Sumi Jo, South Korean soprano
  1962   – Victor Pelevin, Russian engineer and author
  1962   – Rezauddin Stalin, Bangladeshi poet and educator
1963 – Hugh Millen, American football player and sportscaster
  1963   – Tony Mowbray, English footballer and manager
  1963   – Kennedy Pola, Samoan-American football player and coach
  1963   – Brian Robbins, American actor, director, producer, and screenwriter
  1963   – Corinne Russell, English model, actress, and dancer
1964 – Apetor, Norwegian YouTuber (d. 2021)
  1964   – Robbie Slater, English-Australian footballer and sportscaster
1965 – Valeriya Gansvind, Estonian chess player
  1965   – Olga Kisseleva, Russian artist
  1965   – Jörg Jung, German footballer and manager
  1965   – Mads Mikkelsen, Danish actor
  1965   – Kristin Minter, American actress
  1965   – Sen Dog, Cuban-American rapper and musician
1966 – Ed Ferrara, American wrestler and manager
  1966   – Mark Pritchard, English lawyer and politician
  1966   – Richard Stanley, South African director, producer, and screenwriter
1967 – Boris Becker, German-Swiss tennis player and coach
  1967   – Tom Elliott, Australian investment banker
  1967   – Quint Kessenich, American lacrosse player and sportscaster
  1967   – Mark Ruffalo, American actor and activist 
  1967   – Bart Veldkamp, Dutch-Belgian speed skater, coach, and sportscaster
1968 – Sidse Babett Knudsen, Danish actress
  1968   – Rasmus Lerdorf, Greenlandic-Canadian computer scientist and programmer, created PHP
  1968   – Sarah MacDonald, Canadian organist and conductor
1969 – Byron Houston, American basketball player
  1969   – Marjane Satrapi, Iranian author and illustrator
1970 – Marvan Atapattu, Sri Lankan cricketer and coach
  1970   – Chris Fryar, American drummer
  1970   – Stel Pavlou, English author and screenwriter
1971 – Cath Bishop, English rower
  1971   – Kyran Bracken, Irish-English rugby player
  1971   – Cecilia Suárez, Mexican actress and producer
1972 – Olivier Brouzet, French rugby player
  1972   – Russell Hoult, English footballer, coach, and manager
  1972   – Jay Payton, American baseball player and sportscaster
1973 – Dmitri Linter, Russian-Estonian activist
  1973   – Chad Trujillo, American astronomer and scholar
  1973   – Andrew Walker, Australian rugby player
1974 – Joe Nathan, American baseball player
  1974   – David Pelletier, Canadian figure skater and coach
1975 – Aiko, Japanese singer-songwriter
  1975   – Joshua Wheeler, American sergeant (d. 2015)
  1975   – Yusaku Maezawa, Japanese billionaire entrepreneur and art collector
1976 – Adrian Bakalli, Belgian footballer
  1976   – Torsten Frings, German footballer and coach
  1976   – Regina Halmich, German boxer and businesswoman
  1976   – Ville Valo, Finnish singer-songwriter
1977 – Kerem Gönlüm, Turkish basketball player
  1977   – Annika Norlin, Swedish singer-songwriter and guitarist 
  1977   – Michael Preston, English footballer
1978 – Colin Best, Australian rugby league player
  1978   – Mélanie Doutey, French actress and singer
  1978   – Karen O, South Korean-American singer-songwriter and pianist 
1979 – Jeremy Dale, American illustrator (d. 2014)
  1979   – Christian Terlizzi, Italian footballer
1980 – David Artell, English-Gibraltarian footballer and coach
  1980   – Shawn Fanning, American computer programmer and businessman, founded Napster
  1980   – Rait Keerles, Estonian basketball player
  1980   – Yaroslav Rybakov, Russian high jumper
1981 – Asmaa Abdol-Hamid, Arab-Danish social worker and politician
  1981   – Ben Adams, English-Norwegian singer-songwriter and producer
  1981   – Song Hye-kyo, South Korean actress and singer
  1981   – Pape Sow, Senegalese basketball player
  1981   – Jenny Owen Youngs, American singer-songwriter and guitarist
  1981   – Shangela Laquifa Wadley, American drag queen, comedian and reality television personality
1982 – Xavier Doherty, Australian cricketer
  1982   – Alasdair Duncan, Australian journalist and author
  1982   – Isild Le Besco, French actress, director, and screenwriter
  1982   – Yakubu, Nigerian footballer
1983 – Sei Ashina, Japanese actress
  1983   – Corey Beaulieu, American guitarist and songwriter
  1983   – Tyler Hilton, American singer-songwriter, guitarist, and actor
  1983   – Peter Ramage, English footballer
  1983   – Xiao Yu, Taiwanese singer and songwriter
1984 – Scarlett Johansson, American actress
  1984   – Nathalie Nordnes, Norwegian singer-songwriter
1985 – Austin Brown, American singer-songwriter, dancer, and producer
  1985   – Asamoah Gyan, Ghanaian footballer
  1985   – Dieumerci Mbokani, Congolese footballer
  1985   – Ava Leigh, English singer-songwriter
  1985   – Mandy Minella, Luxembourgian tennis player
  1985   – James Roby, English rugby league player
  1985   – DeVon Walker, American football player
1986 – Erika Padilla, Filipino actress and host
  1986   – Oscar Pistorius, South African sprinter
1987 – Martti Aljand, Estonian swimmer
  1987   – Marouane Fellaini, Belgian footballer
1988 – Jamie Campbell Bower, English actor, model and singer
  1988   – Austin Romine, American baseball player
1989 – Candice Glover, American singer-songwriter and actress
  1989   – Minehiro Kinomoto, Japanese actor
  1989   – Chris Smalling, English footballer
  1989   – Gabriel Torje, Romanian footballer
1990 – Jang Dongwoo, South Korean singer and dancer
  1990   – Kartik Aaryan, Indian actor
  1990   – Brock Osweiler, American football player
1991 – Tarik Black, American professional basketball player
1993 – Tridha Choudhury, Indian actress
  1993   – Adèle Exarchopoulos, French actress
1994 – Keiji Tanaka, Japanese figure skater
  1994   – Nicolás Stefanelli, Argentine footballer
  1994   – Samantha Bricio, Mexican volleyball player
  1994   – Dacre Montgomery, Australian actor
1995 – Katherine McNamara, American actress
1996 – Hailey Baldwin, American model
  1996   – JuJu Smith-Schuster, American football player
2000 – Auliʻi Cravalho, Hawaiian-American actress and singer
  2000   – Baby Ariel, American social media vlogger and singer
2001 – Zhong Chenle, Chinese singer, songwriter, dancer, and actor

Deaths

Pre-1600
365 – Antipope Felix II
 950 – Lothair II of Italy (b. 926)
1249 – As-Salih Ayyub, ruler of Egypt
1286 – Eric V of Denmark (b. 1249)
1318 – Mikhail of Tver (b. 1271)
1392 – Robert de Vere, Duke of Ireland (b. 1362)
1538 – John Lambert, English Protestant martyr

1601–1900
1617 – Ahmed I, Sultan of the Ottoman Empire and Caliph of Islam (b. 1590)
1694 – John Tillotson, English archbishop (b. 1630)
1697 – Libéral Bruant, French architect and academic, designed Les Invalides (b. 1635)
1718 – Blackbeard, English pirate (b. 1680)
1758 – Richard Edgcumbe, 1st Baron Edgcumbe, English politician, Lord Lieutenant of Cornwall (db. 1680)
1774 – Robert Clive, English general and politician, Lord Lieutenant of Shropshire (b. 1725)
1794 – John Alsop, American merchant and politician (b. 1724)
1813 – Johann Christian Reil, German physician, physiologist, and anatomist (b. 1759)
1819 – John Stackhouse, English botanist and phycologist (b. 1742)
1871 – Oscar James Dunn, African American activist and politician, Lieutenant Governor of Louisiana 1868-1871 (b. 1826)
1875 – Henry Wilson, American colonel, journalist, and politician, 18th Vice President of the United States (b. 1812)
1886 – Mary Boykin Chesnut, American author (b. 1823)
1896 – George Washington Gale Ferris Jr., American engineer, invented the Ferris wheel (b. 1859)
1900 – Arthur Sullivan, English composer and scholar (b. 1842)

1901–present
1902 – Walter Reed, American physician and entomologist (b. 1851)
1913 – Tokugawa Yoshinobu, Japanese shōgun (b. 1837)
1916 – Jack London, American novelist and journalist (b. 1876)
1917 – Teoberto Maler, Italian-German archaeologist and explorer (b. 1842)
1919 – Francisco Moreno, Argentinian explorer and academic (b. 1852)
1920 – Manuel Pérez y Curis, Uruguayan poet and author (b. 1884)
1923 – Andy O'Sullivan (Irish Republican) died on Hunger Strike 
1926 – Darvish Khan, Iranian tar player (b. 1872)
1932 – William Walker Atkinson, American merchant, lawyer, and author (b. 1862)
1941 – Werner Mölders, German colonel and pilot (b. 1915)
1943 – Lorenz Hart, American playwright and composer (b. 1895)
1944 – Arthur Eddington, English astrophysicist and astronomer (b. 1882)
1946 – Otto Georg Thierack, German jurist and politician, German Minister of Justice (b. 1889)
1948 – Fakhri Pasha, Turkish general and politician (b. 1868)
1954 – Jess McMahon, American wrestling promoter, co-founded Capitol Wrestling Corporation (b. 1882)
1955 – Shemp Howard, American actor and comedian (b. 1895)
1956 – Theodore Kosloff, Russian-American actor, ballet dancer, and choreographer (b. 1882) 
1963 – Wilhelm Beiglböck, Austrian-German physician (b. 1905)
  1963   – Aldous Huxley, English novelist and philosopher (b. 1894)
  1963   – John F. Kennedy, American lieutenant and politician, 35th President of the United States (b. 1917)
  1963   – C. S. Lewis, British writer, critic and Christian apologist (b. 1898)
  1963   – J. D. Tippit, American police officer (Dallas Police Department) (b. 1924)
1967 – Pavel Korin, Russian painter (b. 1892)
1976 – Sevgi Soysal, Turkish author (b. 1936)
1980 – Jules Léger, Canadian journalist and politician, 21st Governor General of Canada (b. 1913)
  1980   – Norah McGuinness, Irish painter and illustrator (b. 1901)
  1980   – Mae West, American stage and film actress (b. 1893)
1981 – Hans Adolf Krebs, German-English physician and biochemist, Nobel Prize laureate (b. 1900)
1986 – Scatman Crothers, American actor and comedian (b. 1910)
1988 – Luis Barragán, Mexican architect and engineer, designed the Torres de Satélite (b. 1908)
1989 – C. C. Beck, American illustrator (b. 1910)
  1989   – René Moawad, Lebanese lawyer and politician, 13th President of Lebanon (b. 1925)
1992 – Sterling Holloway, American actor (b. 1905)
1993 – Anthony Burgess, English novelist, playwright, and critic (b. 1917)
1994 – Minni Nurme, Estonian writer and poet (b. 1917)
  1994   – Forrest White, American businessman (b. 1920)
1996 – María Casares, Spanish-French actress (b. 1922)
  1996   – Terence Donovan, English photographer and director (b. 1936)
  1996   – Mark Lenard, American actor (b. 1924)
1997 – Michael Hutchence, Australian singer-songwriter (b. 1960)
1998 – Stu Ungar, American poker player (b. 1953)
2000 – Christian Marquand, French actor, director, and screenwriter (b. 1927)
  2000   – Emil Zátopek, Czech runner (b. 1922)
2001 – Mary Kay Ash, American businesswoman, founded Mary Kay, Inc. (b. 1915)
  2001   – Theo Barker, English historian and academic (b. 1923)
  2001   – Norman Granz, American-Swiss record producer, founded Verve Records (b. 1918)
2002 – Parley Baer, American actor (b. 1914)
2004 – Arthur Hopcraft, English screenwriter and journalist (b. 1932)
2005 – Bruce Hobbs, American jockey and trainer (b. 1920)
2006 – Asima Chatterjee, Indian chemist (b. 1917)
  2006   – Pat Dobson, American baseball player and coach (b. 1942)
2007 – Maurice Béjart, French-Swiss dancer, choreographer, and director (b. 1929)
  2007   – Verity Lambert, English television producer (b. 1935)
2008 – MC Breed, American rapper (b. 1971)
2010 – Jean Cione, American baseball player and educator (b. 1928)
  2010   – Frank Fenner, Australian virologist and microbiologist (b. 1914)
2011 – Svetlana Alliluyeva, Russian-American author and educator (b. 1926)
  2011   – Sena Jurinac, Bosnian-Austrian soprano and actress (b. 1921)
  2011   – Lynn Margulis, American biologist and academic (b. 1938)
  2011   – Paul Motian, American drummer and composer (b. 1931)
2012 – Pearl Laska Chamberlain, American pilot (b. 1909)
  2012   – Bryce Courtenay, South African-Australian author (b. 1933)
  2012   – Bennie McRae, American football player (b. 1939)
  2012   – P. Govinda Pillai, Indian journalist and politician (b. 1926)
2013 – Don Dailey, American computer programmer (b. 1956)
  2013   – Brian Dawson, English singer (b. 1939)
  2013   – Jancarlos de Oliveira Barros, Brazilian footballer (b. 1983)
  2013   – Tom Gilmartin, Irish businessman (b. 1935)
  2013   – Georges Lautner, French director and screenwriter (b. 1926)
  2013   – Alec Reid, Irish priest and activist (b. 1931)
2014 – Fiorenzo Angelini, Italian cardinal (b. 1916)
  2014   – Don Grate, American baseball and basketball player (b. 1923)
  2014   – Marcel Paquet, Belgian-Polish philosopher and author (b. 1947)
  2014   – Émile Poulat, French sociologist and historian (b. 1920)
2015 – Abubakar Audu, Nigerian banker and politician, Governor of Kogi State (b. 1947)
  2015   – Salahuddin Quader Chowdhury, Bangladeshi politician (b. 1949)
  2015   – Ali Ahsan Mohammad Mojaheed, Bangladeshi politician (b. 1948)
  2015   – Robin Stewart, Indian-English actor and game show host (b. 1946)
  2015   – Kim Young-sam, South Korean soldier and politician, 7th President of South Korea (b. 1929)
2016 – M. Balamuralikrishna, Indian vocalist and singer (b. 1930)
2017 – Bob Avakian, American music producer (b. 1919)
  2017   – Dmitri Hvorostovsky, Russian operatic baritone (b. 1962)
  2017   – Tommy Keene, American singer songwriter (b. 1958)
2020 – Otto Hutter, Austrian-born British physiologist (b. 1924)

Holidays and observances
Arbour Day (British Virgin Islands) 
 Christian feast day: 
Amphilochius of Iconium
 Cecilia
George (Eastern Orthodox, a national holiday in Georgia)
Herbert
Philemon and Apphia
Pragmatius of Autun
 November 22 (Eastern Orthodox liturgics)
Day of Justice (Azerbaijan)
Day of the Albanian Alphabet (Albania and ethnic Albanians)
 Independence Day, celebrates the independence of Lebanon from France in 1943.
 Teacher's Day (Costa Rica)

References

External links

 
 
 

Days of the year
November